Gastrodia, commonly known as potato orchids or as 天麻属 (tian ma shu), is a genus of terrestrial leafless orchids in the family Orchidaceae, about ninety of which have been described. Orchids in this genus have fleshy, upright stems and small to medium-sized resupinate flowers with narrow sepals and petals. They are native to Asia (China, the Russian Far East, Japan, Korea, Southeast Asia, the Indian Subcontinent), Australia, New Zealand, central Africa, and various islands of the Indian and Pacific Oceans.

Description
Orchids in the genus Gastrodia are leafless, terrestrial, mycotrophic herbs with a fleshy, underground rhizome and an upright flowering stem with a few to many brownish, resupinate flowers. The sepals and petals are fused to form a bell-shaped or irregular tube with the tips free. The petals are usually much smaller than the sepals and the labellum has three lobes and is fully enclosed in the tube.

Taxonomy
The genus Gastrodia was first formally described in 1810 by Robert Brown and the description was published in Prodromus Florae Novae Hollandiae et Insulae Van Diemen. The type species is Gastrodia sesamoides.

List of species
The following is a list of species of Gastrodia recognised by Plants of the World Online as of September 2021:

 Gastrodia abscondita J.J.Sm. - Java
 Gastrodia africana Kraenzl. - Cameroon
 Gastrodia agnicellus Hermans & P.J.Cribb - Madagascar
 Gastrodia albida  T.C.Hsu, & C.M.Kuo - Taiwan
 Gastrodia albidoides Y.H.Tan & T.C.Hsu - Yunnan
 Gastrodia amamiana Suetsugu - Japan
 Gastrodia angusta  S.Chow & S.C.Chen - Yunnan
 Gastrodia appendiculata  C.S.Leou & N.J.Chung
 Gastrodia arunachalensis S.N.Hegde & A.N.Rao – Arunachal Pradesh
 Gastrodia ballii P.J.Cribb & Browning - Malawi, Zimbabwe, Mozambique
 Gastrodia bambu Metusala - Java
 Gastrodia boninensis Tuyama - Ogasawara-shoto (Bonin Islands of Japan)
 Gastrodia cajanoae Barcelona & Pelser - Java, Taiwan
 Gastrodia callosa J.J.Sm. - Java, Taiwan
 Gastrodia celebica Schltr. - Sulawesi
 Gastrodia clausa T.C.Hsu, S.W.Chung & C.M.Kuo - Taiwan, Okinawa
 Gastrodia confusa Honda & Tuyama - Taiwan, Korea, Japan, Bonin Islands, Ryukyu Islands
 Gastrodia confusoides T.C.Hsu, S.W.Chung & C.M.Kuo - Taiwan
 Gastrodia cooperae Lehnebach & J.R.Rolfe - New Zealand
 Gastrodia crassisepala L.O.Williams - New Guinea
 Gastrodia crebriflora D.L.Jones - Queensland
 Gastrodia crispa J.J.Sm. – Java
 Gastrodia cunninghamii Hook.f. - Vanuatu, New Zealand (including Chatham Island)
 Gastrodia damingshanensis A.Q.Hu & T.C.Hsu
 Gastrodia dyeriana King & Pantl. - Sikkim, Darjiling
 Gastrodia effusa P.T.Ong & P.O'Byrne - Sabah, Peninsular Malaysia
 Gastrodia elata Blume - much of China (including Tibet and Taiwan), Japan, Korea, Russian Far East, Assam, Bhutan, Nepal
 Gastrodia elatoides W.C.Huang, G.W.Hu & Q.F.Wang - Madagascar 
 Gastrodia entomogama D.L.Jones - A.C.T.
 Gastrodia exilis Hook.f. - India, Assam, Thailand, Sumatra 
 Gastrodia falconeri D.L.Jones & M.A.Clem. - Pakistan, northern India, Nepal
 Gastrodia fimbriata Suddee - Thailand
 Gastrodia flavilabella S.S.Ying - Taiwan
 Gastrodia flexistyla T.C.Hsu & C.M.Kuo - Taiwan
 Gastrodia flexistyloides Suetsugu
 Gastrodia fontinalis T.P.Lin - Taiwan
 Gastrodia fujianensis Liang Ma, Xin Y.Chen & S.P.Chen - China (Fujian)
 Gastrodia gracilis Blume - Taiwan, Honshu
 Gastrodia grandilabris Carr - Sabah
 Gastrodia gunatillekeorum Bandara, Priyankara & Kumar - Sri Lanka
 Gastrodia holttumii Carr 
 Gastrodia huapingenisi X.Y.Huang, A.Q.Hu & Yan Liu 
 Gastrodia isabelensis T.C.Hsu
 Gastrodia javanica (Blume) Lindl. - Indonesia, Malaysia, Philippines, Thailand, Taiwan, Fujian, Ryukyu Islands
 Gastrodia kachinensis X.H.Jin & L.A.Ye – Myanmar
 Gastrodia kaohsiungensis T.P.Lin – Taiwan
 Gastrodia kuroshimensis Suetsugu - Japan
 Gastrodia lacista D.L.Jones - Western Australia
 Gastrodia longitubularis Q.W.Meng, X.Q.Song & Y.B.Luo - Hainan
 Gastrodia madagascariensis H.Perrier ex Martos & Bytebier - Madagascar
 Gastrodia major Aver. - Vietnam
 Gastrodia maliauensis Suetsugu, Suleiman & Tsukaya - Borneo (Sabah)
 Gastrodia menghaiensis Z.H.Tsi & S.C.Chen - Yunnan
 Gastrodia minor Petrie - New Zealand
 Gastrodia mishmensis A.N.Rao, Harid. & S.N.Hegde
 Gastrodia molloyi Lehneback & J.R.Rolfe - New Zealand
 Gastrodia nantoensis T.C.Hsu, C.M.Kuo ex T.P.Lin 
 Gastrodia nipponica Honda) Tuyama - Taiwan, Japan, Ryukyu Islands
 Gastrodia nipponicoides Suetsugu
 Gastrodia × nippouraiensis Suetsugu & T.C.Hsu - Nansei-shoto
 Gastrodia okinawensis Suetsugu
 Gastrodia papuana Schltr. - New Guinea
 Gastrodia peichatieniana S.S.Ying
 Gastrodia phangngaensis Suddee
 Gastrodia procera G.W.Carr - N.S.W., Vic., A.C.T., Tas.
 Gastrodia pubilabiata Y.Sawa - Taiwan, Japan
 Gastrodia punctata Aver. - Vietnam
 Gastrodia putaoensis X.H.Jin - Myanmar
 Gastrodia queenslandica Dockrill - Queensland
 Gastrodia rubinea T.P.Lin - Taiwan
 Gastrodia rwandensis Eb.Fisch. & Killmann - Rwanda
 Gastrodia sabahensis J.J.Wood & A.L.Lamb
 Gastrodia selabintanensis Tsukaya & Hidayat
 Gastrodia sesamoides R.Br. - Australia
 Gastrodia shimizuana Tuyama - Iriomote, Taiwan
 Gastrodia silentvalleyana C.S.Kumar, P.C.S.Kumar, Sibi & S.Anil Kumar - Kerala
 Gastrodia similis Bosser - Réunion
 Gastrodia solomonensis T.C.Hsu
 Gastrodia spatulata (Carr) J.J.Wood - Sabah
 Gastrodia stapfii Hayata
 Gastrodia sui C.S.Leou, T.C.Hsu & C.R.Yeh - Taiwan
 Gastrodia surcula  D.L.Jones - New South Wales
 Gastrodia taiensis Tuyama - Vietnam
 Gastrodia takeshimensis Suetsugu
 Gastrodia tembatensis P.T.Ong & P.O'Byrne - Peninsular Malaysia
 Gastrodia theana Aver. - Vietnam
 Gastrodia tonkinensis Aver. & Averyanova
 Gastrodia tuberculata F.Y.Liu & S.C.Chen - Yunnan
 Gastrodia umbrosa B.Gray - Queensland
 Gastrodia uraiensis T.C.Hsu & C.M.Kuo - Taiwan
 Gastrodia urceolata D.L. Jones - Queensland
 Gastrodia verrucosa Blume - Thailand, Peninsular Malaysia, Java, Sumatra 
 Gastrodia vescula D.L.Jones - South Australia
 Gastrodia wuyishanensis Da M.Li & C.D.Liu - Fujian
 Gastrodia zeylanica Schltr. - Sri Lanka

References

External links
 

 
Gastrodieae genera
Myco-heterotrophic orchids
Taxonomy articles created by Polbot